Edward Francis Miller (1848 - March 15, 1951), MA was the Anglican Archdeacon of Colombo from 1889 to 1891.

He graduated from St John's College, Cambridge in 1871 and was ordained in 1873. After working in England as a school chaplain, he was Warden of St Thomas' College, Mount Lavinia from 1877 until his appointment as Archdeacon.

He died  in his 97th year on 13 March 1951.

References

Sri Lankan Anglican priests
Sri Lankan educational theorists
Anglican chaplains
19th-century English Anglican priests
Alumni of St John's College, Cambridge
Archdeacons of Colombo
People associated with S. Thomas' College, Mount Lavinia
1854 births
1951 deaths